Brady Keeper (born June 5, 1996) is a Canadian professional ice hockey defenceman for the Abbotsford Canucks in the American Hockey League (AHL) while under contract to the Vancouver Canucks of the National Hockey League (NHL).

Playing career
Keeper played junior hockey with the OCN Blizzard of the Manitoba Junior Hockey League (MJHL) from 2013 to 2017 and was named the league's Most Valuable Player for the 2016–17 season. He earned a scholarship to the University of Maine and played two seasons for the NCAA Division I Maine Black Bears, accumulating 57 points in 73 games.

Having gone undrafted into NHL, Keeper left the University of Maine to sign an entry-level contract with the Florida Panthers on March 21, 2019. He made his NHL debut on March 28 against the Ottawa Senators. As a restricted free agent from the Panthers following the Return to Play qualifying series, Keeper was re-signed to a one-year, two-way contract on August 31, 2020.

As a free agent from the Panthers after completing his third season within the organization, Keeper was signed to a two-year, $1.525 million contract with the Vancouver Canucks on July 28, 2021.

Personal life
Keeper was born and raised in Cross Lake in northern Manitoba and is the first person from Cross Lake First Nation to play in the NHL.

Career statistics

Awards and honours

See also
Notable Aboriginal people of Canada

References

External links

1996 births
Living people
Abbotsford Canucks players
Canadian ice hockey defencemen
Cree people
First Nations sportspeople
Florida Panthers players
Ice hockey people from Manitoba
Maine Black Bears men's ice hockey players
OCN Blizzard players
People from Northern Region, Manitoba
Springfield Thunderbirds players
Syracuse Crunch players
Undrafted National Hockey League players